Roger Elliott (1665–1714) was a governor of Gibraltar.

Roger Elliott may also refer to:

 Sir Roger Elliott (physicist) (1928–2018), physicist
 Roger Elliott (politician) (1949–2021), American politician and member of the Kansas House of Representatives

See also
 Roger Dyas-Elliott, political candidate
 Roger Elliot (disambiguation)